is a former Japanese football player.

Playing career
Seki was born in Ibaraki Prefecture on June 5, 1978. After graduating from Osaka University of Commerce, he joined J1 League club Tokyo Verdy in 2001. He debuted in April and played 3 matches in a row as forward after the debut. However he could only this 3 matches and retired end of 2001 season.

Club statistics

References

External links

1978 births
Living people
Osaka University of Commerce alumni
Association football people from Ibaraki Prefecture
Japanese footballers
J1 League players
Tokyo Verdy players
Association football forwards